In American tax administration, backup withholding is a specified percentage (24% for tax years 2018-2025 but previously 28%) withheld by the payers to be paid to the IRS on most kinds of transactions reported on variants of Form 1099. Backup withholding may be required for several reasons, including but not limited to:

 an improper TIN/ITIN/ATIN on the W-9
 an IRS backup withholding order
 certain types of payment are always subject

Banks or other businesses that pay certain kinds of income must file an information return (Form 1099) with the IRS. The Form 1099 shows how much an individual was paid during the year. It also includes the individual's name and Social Security Number (SSN) or other taxpayer identification number (TIN).

Payments reported on a 1099 are generally not subject to withholding. However, "backup" withholding is required in certain situations.

Withholding rules 
When an individual or entity opens a new account, makes an investment, or begins to receive payments reportable on Form 1099, the individual or entity must furnish (in writing) their SSN or other TIN to the bank or other business, and certify under penalties of perjury that it is correct. The bank or business will provide a Form W-9, Request for Taxpayer Identification Number and Certification, or a similar form. The individual or entity must enter their TIN on the form and, if the account or investment will earn interest or dividends, also must certify that they are not subject to backup withholding due to previous under-reporting of interest and dividends.

The payer must withhold at a flat 24% rate in the following situations: 
 You do not give the payer your TIN in the required manner. 
 The IRS notifies the payer that the TIN you gave is incorrect. 
 The IRS notifies the payer to start withholding on interest or dividends because you have underreported interest or dividends on your income tax return. The IRS will do this only after it has mailed you four notices over at least a 120-day period.  
 You fail to certify that you are not subject to backup withholding for underreporting of interest and dividends.

How to prevent or stop backup withholding

If a “B” notice is received from a payer, notifying that the TIN given is incorrect, you usually can prevent backup withholding from starting or stop backup withholding once it has begun by giving the payer your correct name and TIN. You must certify that the TIN you give is correct. If you receive a second “B” notice from that payer, you will need to provide the payer with verification of your TIN from the Social Security Administration or the IRS.

If you have been notified that you underreported interest or dividends, you must request and receive a determination from the IRS to prevent backup withholding from starting or to stop backup withholding once it has begun.

Tax return treatment for backup withholding

If income tax has been withheld under the backup withholding rule, you should take credit for it on your tax return for the year in which you received the income.

More detailed information on backup withholding can be found in Publication 1281 (PDF), Backup Withholding for Missing and Incorrect Name/TIN(s), including the procedures for payers, and in Publication 505, Tax Withholding and Estimated Tax.

State backup withholding
Some states may also require backup withholding if it is already required by the IRS. 
 California: 7%
 Vermont: 7.56% 
 Maine: 5%

References

External links
IRS: Backup Withholding

Internal Revenue Service
Withholding taxes